Zsolt Szabó (born 1 January 1972) is a Hungarian football referee. He was a full international for FIFA beginning in 1999; as of 2013, however, he was not included on the FIFA list.

Szabó served as a referee in qualification for the 2006 and 2010 World Cup tournaments, in addition to qualifiers for the 2003 FIFA Women's World Cup. He also officiated in qualifiers for the Euro 2004 and Euro 2008 tournaments, the 2002 UEFA European Under-17 Football Championship, and the 2007 UEFA European Under-21 Football Championship.

References

External links
Zsolt Szabó on WorldReferee.com

1972 births
Living people
Hungarian football referees